Alexander Albertovich Veshnyakov (b. November 24, 1952, in Arkhangelsk Oblast, Soviet Union) is a Russian official. Between March 21, 1995 and March 24, 1999, he was the Secretary of the Central Election Commission of Russia. He was the Chairman of the Central Election Commission between March 24, 1999 and March 26, 2007.

Biography
Veshnyakov lost his post heading the elections commission after he balked at putting into effect an election law revision that removed a minimum 20% turnout requirement, without which an election was invalid, and introduced new reasons for refusing registration to would-be candidates, saying it could be a pretext for refusing registration to candidates who were “undesirable”.

President Vladimir Putin simply did not put forward Veshnyakov’s name for renewed membership of the election commission.

Before the voting law was changed, Veshnyakov had in July 2006 told the Itogi weekly that if the ruling pro-Kremlin United Russia party that secured victory at any cost by changing the electoral laws, it would be a "Pyrrhic victory", RIA Novosti reported on March 13. In an apparent reference to the Soviet Union, he had said: "Just recently, we had a sham legislature and sham elections, and it did not hamper the country's development at that point. But the system failed to survive the test of time and collapsed."

‘[His] ousting, according to some experts, can be explained by his critical attitude to the most outrageous amendments to the electoral legislation (the abolition of the minimum turnout and the ‘none-of the above’ entry on the ballot),’ political commentator Dmitry Shusharin wrote for the country’s state new agency, RIA Novosti. ‘And even if there were no such remarks, his eight years in the post have earned Veshnyakov considerable weight in the country and the world, making him a media person of note. For the political establishment in Russia, all this is reason enough to doubt the man's political loyalty and suspect him of being a maverick.’

Veshnyakov was appointed Ambassador of Russia to Latvia, Radio Free Europe reported on January 11 quoting the gazeta.ru news portal the same day. 
The Kremlin, the radio reported, had been looking for a senior post away from Moscow to which it could send Veshnyakov, who was well known in Russia as the often outspoken former head of the Central Election Commission. His replacement, former ultranationalist State Duma deputy Vladimir Churov, had said he was "less likely to comment on election law and more inclined to get things done" than Veshnyakov.

On December 15, 2016 Alexander Veshnyakov was dismissed from the position of Ambassador in Latvia.

Honours and awards
 Order of Merit for the Fatherland;
2nd class (27 March 2007) - for outstanding contribution to strengthening Russian statehood, development and improvement of the electoral system of the Russian Federation
3rd class (30 December 2004) - a contribution to strengthening Russian statehood, development of electoral systems and long-term diligent work
4th class
 Defender of Free Russia Medal (20 August 1997) - for performing their civic duty in defence of democracy and constitutional order during 19–21 August 1991
 Jubilee Medal "300 Years of the Russian Navy"
 Medal "In Commemoration of the 850th Anniversary of Moscow"

References

1952 births
Living people
Diplomatic Academy of the Ministry of Foreign Affairs of the Russian Federation alumni
Members of election commissions
Ambassador Extraordinary and Plenipotentiary (Russian Federation)
Ambassadors of Russia to Latvia
Recipients of the Order "For Merit to the Fatherland", 2nd class
Recipients of the Order "For Merit to the Fatherland", 3rd class
Recipients of the Order "For Merit to the Fatherland", 4th class
Communist Party of the Soviet Union members